ANSCA may refer to:
 Alaska Native Claims Settlement Act
 Corona Labs Inc., a venture-backed mobile software company formerly known as Ansca Mobile